Paycor Stadium, previously known as Paul Brown Stadium, is an outdoor football stadium in Cincinnati, Ohio. It is the home venue of the Cincinnati Bengals of the National Football League and opened on August 19, 2000. The stadium is nicknamed "The Jungle", an allusion to not only the namesake Bengal tiger's natural habitat—hinted at with green-colored seats throughout—but also the Guns N' Roses song "Welcome to the Jungle", which is the team's unofficial anthem.

History
In 1996, Hamilton County voters passed a one-half percent sales tax increase to fund the building of two new home venues for both the Bengals and MLB's Cincinnati Reds. The Bengals and the Reds previously shared tenancy of Riverfront Stadium, later known as Cinergy Field, but both teams complained that the aging multipurpose facility lacked modern amenities and other things necessary for small-market teams to thrive and survive. Construction of the replacements for Cinergy Field began with the groundbreaking for the then-Paul Brown Stadium in 1998; the stadium was completed in time for the 2000 NFL season and opened in August of that year. Cinergy Field would then spend two seasons as a partially-demolished, baseball-only facility (the construction of Great American Ball Park necessitating this) before what was left of it was imploded in December 2002. 

For its first four years, the field was natural Kentucky Bluegrass, but maintenance problems arose, and at one point it was rated as the third worst field in the league. Hamilton County explored other options and chose the synthetic FieldTurf system. The infilled artificial turf looks and feels like real grass and, since the field markings are sewn into the fabric, repainting between games is unnecessary. The reduced maintenance saved the county approximately US$100,000 annually. Additionally, it opens Paycor Stadium to other uses without worry of damage to the turf. The FieldTurf was installed for the 2004 season. The field is one of only two stadiums in the NFL to have "five miles of piping" running under the field to keep the rubber inlays heated. In April 2012, the stadium chose to update the playing surface with an installation of Act Global synthetic turf. In 2018, the stadium was equipped with a new top-of-the-line synthetic turf system. Manufactured by Shaw Sports Turf, the product includes Strenexe XD slit-film fibers that are supported by  synthetic turf backing , UltraLoc.
   
Two LED video displays at either end zone, installed in 2000, provide a good view of the on-field action for every spectator.  Over  of ribbon display were  installed along the fascia of the stadium. The scoreboards and ribbons were later upgraded after the 2014 off-season to larger HD models.

On August 9, 2022, the stadium entered a naming rights agreement with Paycor HCM Inc., expanding the company's sponsorship deal with the Bengals that saw the stadium renamed Paycor Stadium, with the company paying an undisclosed sum for 16 years of naming rights. This made Lambeau Field the only stadium named after a person in the league, and it along with Chicago's Soldier Field the only two stadiums without a naming rights partner in the NFL.

Notable events

College football
The Cincinnati Bearcats from the University of Cincinnati and the Ohio State Buckeyes from Ohio State University played the first college football game at the stadium on September 21, 2002, before a sold-out crowd of 66,319. On September 5, 2009, the Kentucky Wildcats and the Miami Redhawks played their opening games there. The University of Cincinnati also played Oklahoma in 2010 at the stadium. The Sooners won the game 31–29 with 58,253 fans in attendance. In 2011 the Bearcats played Big East Conference opponents Louisville Cardinals and West Virginia Mountaineers at the stadium. The Bearcats returned to the stadium for the 2014 football season due to renovations of Nippert Stadium, with the largest attendance being Miami (OH) at 41,926. The average attendance was 28,840 for the year. On September 8, 2018, Miami (OH) hosted the Bearcats at the stadium for their annual Victory Bell rivalry, which will also feature games at Paycor Stadium in 2022 and 2026.

Concerts
The Cincinnati Music Festival (formerly the Cincinnati Jazz Festival) is held there every year.

Other events
Unusual for a venue of its size, Paycor Stadium hosts the annual Queen City Classic Chess Tournament in the spring.

Features
Paycor Stadium also houses the Bengals' administrative offices and training and practice facilities. The game field at Paycor Stadium is Momentum Pro, manufactured by Show Sports Turf. There are three smaller practice fields nearby. Two are sodded with natural grass, while the third is equipped with AstroTurf.

Several local busing companies offer round trip transportation to Paycor Stadium from designated locations throughout the Cincinnati and Northern Kentucky area. One such example is the Cincinnati Metro's Jungle-to-Jungle Express, which originates at Jungle Jim's International Market in Fairfield, a suburb of Cincinnati.

Premium seating options are available in 114 private suites and 7,600 club seats. Amenities include in-seat food and beverage service and access to the club lounges for fine dining options.

On-site retail merchandise sales are available in the Bengals pro shop, located on the plaza level on the north end of the stadium. There are 56 concession stands and eight stores.

Architecture

The stadium was designed by architectural firm NBBJ, led by Dan Meis. It was the first NFL facility to win an AIA design award, and one of only two sports venues to be honored. The open corners allow for views into the stadium, while stadium fans can view the downtown skyline and bridges crossing the Ohio River.

Paycor Stadium is the only football stadium to make a list of "America's favorite 150 buildings and structures", according to a Harris Interactive survey. It ranked 101st on the list, whose range included all manner of major structures — skyscrapers, museums, churches, hotels, bridges, national memorials and more. No other football stadium was voted among the top 150, and among all sports venues, only Wrigley Field (31) and Yankee Stadium (84) ranked higher.

References

External links

 

Cincinnati Bengals stadiums
Cincinnati Bearcats football
American football venues in Ohio
High school football venues in Ohio
National Football League venues
Sports venues in Cincinnati
Sports venues completed in 2000
NBBJ buildings
2000 establishments in Ohio